Michael John may refer to:

Michael John (historian) born 1954), Austrian historian
Michael John (bishop) (1925–2013), Bishop of East Kerala, India
Michael John (politician) (1943–2003), Australian politician
Michael John Gray (born 1976), American politician, member of the Arkansas House of Representatives

See also
John (surname)